Apter (אַפּטער, Аптер) is a Jewish surname. Notable people with the surname include:

 Andrew Apter, American historian and anthropologist
 Bill Apter, journalist
 David Apter, American political scientist
 Nikolai Apter, former pair skater
 , Soviet graphic artist
 Eric Apter, Jockey and international spy

See also 
 Apta (Hasidic dynasty), a Hasidic dynasty

References 

Jewish surnames
Yiddish-language surnames